Kammara Sambhavam is a 2018 Indian Malayalam-language genre-bending satirical-thriller film  written by Murali Gopy and directed by Rathish Ambat. The film was produced by Gokulam Gopalan and stars Dileep, Siddharth, Murali Gopy, Bobby Simha, and Namitha Pramod. The film marks the Malayalam film debut of Siddharth. Principal photography began on 18 August 2016 in Kochi. The film was released in India on 14 April 2018. The film won the National Film Award for Best Production Design.

Plot
A group of liquor barons, who are members of the Indian Liberation Party (ILP), want the declining party to win the upcoming Kerala state election to benefit their business interests. To raise the ILP's image, they decide to make a biopic about Kammaran Nambiar, the party patriarch and the last veteran of the Indian independence movement. They ask director Pulikeshi to make a film based on a chapter in the book Unsung Heroes of India by Robert S. Coogan, in which Kammaran is depicted as a forgotten freedom fighter.

Pulikeshi meets Kammaran, now an ailing old man living in an old house with his son Bose. Kammaran tells the young man a story:  During World War II, Kammaran was a cunning medical practitioner who would do anything for personal gain. To destroy his love rival, Othenan, Kammaran incites violence between the villagers, Othenan, Othenan's father and cruel landlord Kelu, and British officers. During the violence, Kammaran kills Kelu and Othenan is arrested. Later, Othenan visits Kammaran in the night, but as Kammaran tells the story he begins coughing and is unable to continue.

Pulikeshi makes the film as the ILP instructed, and when Kammaran watches it he realizes the roles have been reversed.  In the film, Othenan and his friend Singh are working for the British; they are captured as traitors by Netaji (Subhas Chandra Bose) but they escape and Othenan kills the man who reported their treason. The landlord's wife Maheshwari is then shown inflicting cruelty when Kammaran arrives as the leader of the ILP, preventing the harassment of poor tenants and gaining such mass support that Maheshwari is forced to flee. Kammaran is shown doing many things for the benefit of the villagers, such as looting money from the British to distribute it amongst the villagers. Kammaran marries Bhanumathi (Namitha Pramod) when Othenan returns and plots with Maheshwari and the British against Kammaran. The plot involves using Netaji's death to gain Kammaran's trust so that they can then blame Kammaran for the planned assassination of Mahatma Gandhi.

Kammaran then tells the story of how he met Netaji. During the Battle of Imphal in 1944, Kammaran saved Netaji who was injured by a grenade; Netaji found such confidence in Kammaran that he asked him to form a party for the people. As a strong symbol, Kammaran took the axe, the weapon Maheshwari's men used to murder his father, on which he swore revenge against India's landlord system. Kammaran returns to AmruthaSamudram and forms the ILP.

To foil the assassination plot, Kammaran posts his men in three places along Gandhi's procession route to a temple, while he rides on a train with Gandhi. Othenan secretly boards the train and moves against Gandhi, but an informer has warned Kammaran who stops and chases him, fighting, and Othenan is killed after a brutal struggle on top of the train. Kammaran stands to be hanged for killing a British officer. The only person who believes his story is Robert S. Coogan, who convinces Jawaharlal Nehru to free him. The film ends with Kammaran refusing his followers' request to participate in elections, but promising to be back when he is needed.

The film becomes a success and helps the ILP return to power. Elderly Kammaran is made the Chief Minister of Kerala. Pulikesi arrives and asks him what really happened to Othenan. It is then shown that years later Othenan came for Bhanumathi who was then Kammaran's wife, and Kammaran killed him brutally but doesn't reveal this to Pulikeshi. Kammaran tells Pulikeshi that the movie is now history in everybody's mind and that the actual events no longer matter.

Cast

 Dileep as Kammaran Nambiar / himself
 Siddharth as Othenan Nambiar / himself
 Murali Gopy as Kelu Nambiar / himself 
 Namitha Pramod as Bhanumathi / herself
 Bobby Simha as Pulikeshi
 Shweta Menon as Malayil Maheshwari / herself
 Manikuttan as Thilakan Purushothamman / himself
 Kenny Basumatary as Netaji Subhas Chandra Bose
 Vijayaraghavan as Francis
 Siddique as Bose Kammaran
 Nedumudi Venu as Selvan Moopenu
 Indrans as ILP Surendran
 Vinay Forrt as Chandrabanu
 Sudheer Karamana as Rajappan
 Baiju as Siju Dineshan
 Divya Prabha as Kamala Nambiar/ herself
 Master Ajaz as young Kammaran
 Santhosh Keezhattoor as Viswambharan Nambiar, Kammaran's and Kamala's Father
 Anjali Nair as Kammaran's and Kamala's Mother
 Andy Von Eich as Robert Cogon
 Simarjeet Singh Nagra as Satnam Singh (Othenan's friend) / himself
 Paul Reardon as Merchiston
 Murugan as Murugeshan
Babu Annur as Pattar
Vanitha as Gomathi
Kanchanamma as Grandmother
 Arun as Manukumar
Prathapan as Maruthu
Sonia as Irene
 Sona Nair as Bose's wife
Major Kishore as Himanshu
Surendra Rajan as Mahathma Gandhi
Sourabh Dubey as Jawaharlal Nehru

Production
Kammara Sambhavam is the feature film directorial debut of prolific advertisement filmmaker Rathish Ambat. The plot follows the adventures of Kammaran, the character played by Dileep. According to Ambat, "we can't limit the movie to any specific genre", it has politics, contemporary relevance, history and elements of a thriller. He describes the film as "a satire that has politics, history and cinema". Murali Gopi worked on the script for nearly two years. He describes the film as a satire that crisscross period, pop, and black comedy. Sidharth makes his Malayalam film debut with the film. Namitha Pramod plays the female lead.

Principal photography began on 18 August 2016 in Kochi. The production was unexpectedly stalled while it was filming in Theni, Tamil Nadu, during July 2017 because of Dileep's arrest. After a break, filming resumed on 9 October 2017 in Vengara, Malappuram district; Dileep rejoined the film on 20 October in Malayattoor, Ernakulam district. There was a schedule in Chennai which completed before December 2017, after which one schedule was remaining to be shot in Theni. By the time it stalled production in July, the film had already spend 10 crore (100 million rupees) on budget. It was completed on a total budget of 20 crore.

Soundtrack
The film's original songs were composed by Gopi Sundar.

References

External links
 

2010s Malayalam-language films
2018 films
Films about filmmaking
2010s satirical films
Indian satirical films
Films whose production designer won the Best Production Design National Film Award
Indian war films
2018 thriller films